The 2018 WAC men's soccer tournament was the 11th edition of the tournament. It determined the Western Athletic Conference's automatic berth into the 2018 NCAA Division I Men's Soccer Championship. 

The defending champions were Seattle U.  However, they were unable to defend their title, falling 5–6 in a penalty shootout against San Jose State in the semifinals. The eventual champions were the Grand Canyon Antelopes, who won the tournament after a 1–0 victory over San Jose State in the final. This was the first WAC men's soccer title for Grand Canyon, and the first for coach Schellas Hyndman.

Background 

Seattle U won their third WAC title, defeating San Jose State, 2–1 in the championship game. With the win, Seattle U surpassed UNLV and Fresno State with the most WAC Tournament titles. With the berth, Seattle U earned an automatic bid into the NCAA Tournament. There, they upset city-rivals, Washington, in the first round, before falling to Akron in the second round.

Seeding 

The top seven teams will qualify for the tournament.

Bracket

Schedule

Quarterfinals

Semifinals

Final

Statistics

Goalscorers
2 Goals
 Rooby Dalusma - UTRGV

1 Goal
 Marco Afonso - Grand Canyon
 William Akio - UTRGV
 Kyle Edwards - UTRGV
 Sam Gardner - Grand Canyon
 Bay Kurtz - UNLV
 Omar Lemus - San Jose State
 Noe Meza - Seattle U
 Connor Noblat - Seattle U
 Jonathan Partida - San Jose State
 Zach Penner - San Jose State
 Alex Radilla - Grand Canyon
 Eddie Saylee - San Jose State
 Kees Westra - Seattle U

All Tournament Team

References

External links 
 2018 WAC Men's Soccer Tournament

Western Athletic Conference Men's Soccer
2018